Rocconota is a genus of assassin bugs in the family Reduviidae. There are about 10 described species in Rocconota.

Species
These 10 species belong to the genus Rocconota:
 Rocconota annulicornis (Stål, 1872)
 Rocconota bruchi Lima, 1941
 Rocconota hystricula Champion, 1899
 Rocconota laeviceps Champion, 1899
 Rocconota octospina Stål, 1862
 Rocconota rufotestacea Champion, 1899
 Rocconota sexdentata Stål, 1859
 Rocconota sextuberculata Stål, 1859
 Rocconota subannulata (Stål, 1860)
 Rocconota tuberculigera (Stål, 1862)

References

Further reading

 
 

Reduviidae
Articles created by Qbugbot